Heydarabad (also Romanized as Ḩeydarābād and Haidarābād) is a village in Chalanchulan Rural District, Silakhor District, Dorud County, Lorestan Province, Iran. At the 2006 census, its population was 144, in 36 families.

References 

Towns and villages in Dorud County